The Vallvidrera Funicular (both Catalan and Spanish:Funicular de Vallvidrera) is a  funicular railway in the Barcelona district of Sarrià-Sant Gervasi, in Catalonia, Spain. It connects Peu del Funicular station on the Barcelona–Vallès Line with the residential neighborhood of Vallvidrera, in the Collserola mountain range.

Although initially privately owned by Ferrocarril de Sarriá a Barcelona (FSB), it was transferred to the Catalan government together with the Barcelona–Vallès Line after FSB's economic collapse. Thus, since , the funicular has been operated by Ferrocarrils de la Generalitat de Catalunya (FGC). In 1998, it was entirely rebuilt and upgraded to an automated guideway transit (AGT) system, including the introduction of new rolling stock.

The funicular is integrated as part of the Vallès Metro high-frequency commuter rail scheme. It runs at a basic interval of 6 minutes on weekdays, less frequently on weekends and public holidays, with a journey time of 2 minutes and 50 seconds (without considering any intermediate stops). Besides, it is entirely within fare zone 1 of the  Autoritat del Transport Metropolità (ATM) fare-integrated public transport system for the Barcelona metropolitan area.

History
The line was opened in 1906. Its upper station (Vallvidrera Superior) was designed by the architects Bonaventura Conill i Montobbio and Arnald Calvet i Peyronill in the Catalan Modernist style.

The line became part of the FGC network in 1981. It was rebuilt in 1998, with the introduction of new cars, platform screen doors and fully automated operation. The new cars were built by Gangloff of Bern.

Technical features
The funicular has the following technical parameters:

List of stations
The following table lists the name of each station on the Vallvidrera Funicular in ascendent order (from south to north), a photo of the current station, its elevation, its coordinates, remarkable notes and usage figures.

Notes

References

Bibliography

External links

 Ferrocarrils de la Generalitat de Catalunya (FGC) official website 
 Vallvidrera Funicular at trenscat.cat 
 Vallvidrera Funicular at Funiculars.net
 Video of the funicular's route on YouTube

Ferrocarrils de la Generalitat de Catalunya
Funicular railways in Barcelona
Railway lines opened in 1906
Transport in Sarrià-Sant Gervasi
Metre gauge railways in Spain
1906 establishments in Spain